Abolaji Omotayo Oluwaseun (born 12 June 1998) is a Nigerian  sprinter. She won a gold medal in the 4 x 100 meter relay, at the 2015 African Junior Athletics Championships .

Life 
She participated in the 2014 Nigerian Youth Championships (U18). She won a bronze medal, in the 100 meters, at 12.57, behind Aniekeme Alphonsus and Favor Ekezie . She participated at the 2014 World Junior Championships in Athletics. She participated at the 2015 Commonwealth Youth Games , winning a gold medal at the 4×100 metres relay.

References

External links 
 https://www.worldathletics.org/athletes/nigeria/omotayo-oluwaseun-abolaji-14636836

1998 births
Nigerian female sprinters
Living people
Yoruba sportswomen
Yoruba people
21st-century Nigerian women